John C. Dvorak (born 1952) is an American columnist and broadcaster in the areas of technology and computing. His writing extends back to the 1980s, when he was a regular columnist in a variety of magazines. He was vice president of Mevio, and has been a host on TechTV and TWiT.tv. He is currently a co-host of the No Agenda podcast.

Early life
Dvorak was born in 1952 in Los Angeles, California. The nephew of sociologist and creator of the Dvorak keyboard, August Dvorak, he graduated from the University of California, Berkeley with a degree in history, with a minor in chemistry.

Writing career

Periodicals
Dvorak started his career as a wine writer.

He has written for various publications, including InfoWorld, PC Magazine (two separate columns since 1986), MarketWatch, BUG Magazine (Croatia), and Info Exame (Brazil). He has been a columnist for Boardwatch, Forbes, Forbes.com, MacUser, MicroTimes, PC/Computing, Barron's Magazine, Smart Business, and The Vancouver Sun. (The MicroTimes column ran under the banner Dvorak's Last Column.) He has written for The New York Times, Los Angeles Times, MacMania Networks, International Herald Tribune, The San Francisco Examiner and The Philadelphia Inquirer, among numerous other publications.

On episode 524 of the No Agenda podcast, he mentioned that MarketWatch had "gotten rid of him" after Adam Curry made a suggestion for his next column. He did not give further details.

Dvorak created a few tech running jokes. In episode 18 of TWiT (This Week in Tech) he claimed that, thanks to his hosting provider, he "gets no spam."

Books
Dvorak has written or co-authored over a dozen books, including Hypergrowth: The Rise and Fall of the Osborne Computer Corporation with Adam Osborne and Dvorak's Guide to Desktop Telecommunications in 1990, Dvorak's Guide to PC Telecommunications (Osborne McGraw-Hill, Berkeley, California, 1992), Dvorak's Guide to OS/2 (Random House, New York, 1993) with co-authors Dave Whittle and Martin McElroy, Dvorak Predicts (Osborne McGraw-Hill, Berkeley, California, 1994), Online! The Book (Prentice Hall PTR, October, 2003) with co-authors Wendy Taylor and Chris Pirillo and his latest e-book is Inside Track 2013.

Awards and honors
The Computer Press Association presented Dvorak with the Best Columnist and Best Column awards. He was also the winner of the American Business Editors Association's national gold award in 2004 and 2005, for Best Online Columns of 2003 and 2004, respectively.

He was the creator and lead judge of the Dvorak Awards (1992–1997).

In 2001, he received the Telluride Tech Festival Award of Technology.

He has received the title of Kentucky Colonel, the highest title of honor awarded by the Commonwealth of Kentucky.

In July, 2016, Dvorak and co-host Adam Curry won the "Best Podcast" Podcast Award for No Agenda, in the News & Politics category.

TV and online media

Dvorak was on the start-up team for CNET Networks, appearing on the television show CNET Central. He also hosted a radio show called Real Computing, and later 'Technically Speaking' on NPR, as well as a television show on TechTV (formerly ZDTV) called Silicon Spin.

He appeared on Marketwatch TV and This Week in Tech, a podcast audio and now video program hosted by Leo Laporte and featuring other former TechTV personalities such as Patrick Norton, Kevin Rose, and Robert Heron. Dvorak was once banned from the show. In March 2006, he started a new show called CrankyGeeks, where he led a rotating panel of "cranky" tech gurus in discussions of technology news stories of the week. The last episode (No. 237) aired on September 22, 2010.

In 2007, Mevio hired Dvorak as Vice President and Managing Editor for a new Mevio TECH channel, where he manages content from existing Mevio tech programming. He also hosted the show "Tech5", where he discussed the day's tech news in approximately five minutes; it ended production in late 2010. He co-hosts a podcast with Mevio co-founder Adam Curry called No Agenda. The show is a conversation about the week's news, happenings in the lives of the hosts and their families, and restaurant reviews from the dinners Dvorak and Curry have together when they are in the same city (usually San Francisco). Curry usually has more outlandish opinions of the week's news or world events, while Dvorak plays the straight man in the dialogue.

Since early 2011, Dvorak has been one of the featured "CoolHotNot Tech Xperts," along with Chris Pirillo, Jim Louderback, Dave Graveline, Robin Raskin, Dave Whittle, Steve Bass, and Cheryl Currid, at CoolHotNot's web site, He shares his "Loved List" of favorite consumer electronics, his "Wanted List" of tech products he'd like to try, and his "Letdown List" of tech products he found disappointing.

Dvorak hosted the show X3, which, like the defunct Tech 5, was a short tech-focused cast. Unlike Tech 5, it was in video format, with two co-hosts. The last update was 24 June 2012.

Since September 2009, Dvorak has hosted the DH Unplugged podcast with personal money manager Andrew Horowitz.

He is a co-founder, with Gina Smith and the late Jerry Pournelle, of the web site aNewDomain.net, where he is also a columnist.

In September 2015, Leo Laporte famously "banned" Dvorak—his long-time friend and frequent guest—from TWiT for comments Dvorak made on Twitter. In reply to Dvorak's comments that Laporte was biased, Laporte told Dvorak "you won't ever have to worry about it again", insinuating that he never wanted Dvorak back on TWiT. Laporte apologized a few days later. Dvorak returned to TWiT on December 23, 2018.

Criticism and advocacy for new technology

On February 19, 1984, in an article in The San Francisco Examiner, Dvorak listed the mouse as one of many reasons Apple Inc.'s Macintosh computer might not be successful: "The Macintosh uses an experimental pointing device called a ‘mouse’. There is no evidence that people want to use these things." In 1987 he revisited the article and recanted, writing "The Mac mouse is great. I've been converted."

In 1985, following Steve Jobs leaving Apple, Dvorak wrote, "Maybe when the smoke clears, we will have heard the last of Steve Jobs as guru, seer, visionary and hapless victim too ... He'll go the way of pet rock, electric carving knives, silly putty, Tiny Tim, and the three-tone paint job. Let's hope so."

In the May 26, 1987 edition of PC Mag, Dvorak investigated the origin of the term nerd, crediting and quoting Theodor S. Geisel (Dr. Seuss) with coining the phrase in 1950 having "never heard the word before."

In his 2007 article for MarketWatch regarding the iPhone, Dvorak wrote, "If [Apple's] smart, it will call the iPhone a 'reference design' and pass it to some suckers to build with someone else's marketing budget. Then it can wash its hands of any marketplace failures. [... ] It should do that immediately before it's too late." Although he later admitted having been wrong about its success, he criticized Apple's iPad when it first appeared in 2010, stating that it was no different from other previous tablets that had failed: "I cannot see it escaping the tablet computer dead zone any time soon."

Dvorak has mentioned in the past that he is a fan of MorphOS and used the Video Toaster in its heyday.

In 2018 he wrote an article on Medium in which he claimed he was fired from PC Magazine because of an article he wrote that questioned the safety of 5G.

Criticism of Creative Commons
In 2005, Dvorak wrote "Creative Commons Humbug", an opinion piece criticizing Creative Commons licensing.

Personal life
Dvorak married Mimi Smith-Dvorak on August 8, 1988. He is listed as a minister of the Universal Life Church. He said on show #600 of No Agenda that he occasionally posts online under the pseudonym Mark Pugner.

References

External links

 
 PC Magazine: John C. Dvorak's column 
 PC Magazine: John C. Dvorak's profile
 PC Magazine: John C. Dvorak's Inside Track
 MarketWatch: John C. Dvorak's Second Opinion
 aNewDomain.net: John C. Dvorak's column archive
 CrankyGeeks official site 
 No Agenda Show Podcast
 Dvorak's current list of best, most wanted, and worst tech products
 DH Unplugged

Amateur radio people
American male journalists
American male bloggers
American bloggers
American columnists
American people of Czech descent
University of California, Berkeley alumni
Living people
TechTV people
American podcasters
1952 births
21st-century American non-fiction writers
Berkeley Macintosh Users Group members